Adoga Augustine Onah (born 20 January 1940) was a former Nigerian Ambassador whose diplomatic postings included Sweden, the Philippines, and the United States.

Education and personal life

Born in Okpoma, Cross River State, Nigeria, Onah studied Politics and International Relations on scholarship at St Peter's College, Oxford before embarking on his diplomatic career. He served at postings in Asia, Europe, Africa, and North America.

He is the father of twin filmmakers Anthony Onah and Julius Onah.

Career

Onah served as Nigerian ambassador to Equatorial Guinea and the Democratic People's Republic of Korea.

In 1993, Onah began a five-year posting to the United States, where he represented Nigeria during the Clinton Administration.

References

Alumni of St Peter's College, Oxford
1940 births
2009 deaths
Ambassadors of Nigeria to the United States
Nigerian diplomats
Peoples Democratic Party (Nigeria) politicians